The 1993 Nescafé Extra Challenge was a  professional non-ranking snooker tournament that was played in Bangkok, Thailand in January 1993. Four players participated - Alan McManus, Ronnie O'Sullivan, John Parrott and James Wattana. 17 year old  O'Sullivan won the tournament to collect his first professional title. As champion, O'Sullivan received £10,500 from the total prize fund of £30,000. The tournament was played in a Round-Robin group format.


Results
If points were level then most frames won determined their positions.

  5 – 3 
  5 – 4 
  5 – 0 
  5 – 3 
  5 – 1 
  5 – 3

Century breaks
The following century breaks were made at the tournament.
 102  James Wattana
 101  Ronnie O'Sullivan
 101  John Parrott

References

1993 in snooker